"Ajax Hup Hup Hup" is a Levenslied song by Tante Leen which was released on His Master's Voice in 1966. It is dedicated to Tante Leen's hometown association football club AFC Ajax from Amsterdam. The song is the A-side to the record "Ajax Hup Hup Hup / Mijn man is Ajaxied" which was released as a 7"-single. The song is the first of many records Tante Leen has released and dedicated to her favorite football club throughout the span of her career.

Johnny Jordaan version
The song was re-released a year later, this time sung by her significant other Johnny Jordaan and featured on his album De zilvervloot of 1967.

References
Footnotes

External links
 Tante Leen's "Ajax Hup Hup Hup / Mijn Man Is Ajaxied" release on Discogs

AFC Ajax songs
1966 singles
Dutch pop songs
Dutch-language songs
Football songs and chants
1966 songs